Jacques Bouillart (1669 – 11 December 1726) was a Benedictine monk of the Congregation of St.-Maur.

Bouillart was born in the Diocese of Chartres. He professed at the Monastery of St. Faron de Meaux in 1687. He was the author of Histoire de l'abbaye royale de Saint-Germain-des-Prés (Paris, 1724). This history of the Benedictine monastery contains biographies of the abbots that ruled over it, since its foundation by Childeric I in 543, along with historical events related to the abbey. It also contains many illustrations and detailed descriptions of architecture, art and historical documents. Bouillart also edited a martyrology of Usuard. In this publication he attempted to establish the genuineness and authenticity of the manuscript preserved at Saint-Germain-des-Prés, against the Jesuit hagiographer Père Jean-Baptiste Du Sollier (1669–1740), who in his revised edition of Usuard's martyrology had paid no attention to this manuscript.

References
De Lama, Bibliothèque des écrivains de la congrégation de Saint-Maur (Munich and Paris, 1882), 128
Magnoald Ziegelbauer, Historia rei literariae ordinis S. Benedicti (Augsburg and Wurzburg, 1754), IV, 558
Hugo von Hurter, Nomenclator (Innsbruck, 1893), II, 1201
Jean-Philippe Le Cerf, Bibliothèque historique et critique des auteurs de la Congrégation de Saint-Maur (The Hague 1726)

1669 births
1726 deaths
French Benedictines
18th-century French historians
French male non-fiction writers